Gábor Szarvas ( in Újpest -  in Budapest) was a Hungarian male weightlifter, who competed in the middleweight class and represented Hungary at international competitions. He won the silver medal at the 1969 World Weightlifting Championships and the bronze medal at the 1970 World Weightlifting Championships, both in the 75 kg category. He participated at the 1972 Summer Olympics in the 75 kg event. Szarvas had furthermore the following podium finishes at major championships: second in the 1969 European Championships Middleweight class (440.0 kg); second in the 1970 European Championships Middleweight class (452.5 kg); second in the 1971 European Championships Middleweight class (460.0 kg); second in the 1978 European Championships Featherweight class (275.0 kg).

References

External links
 

1943 births
Hungarian male weightlifters
World Weightlifting Championships medalists
People from Újpest
Olympic weightlifters of Hungary
Weightlifters at the 1972 Summer Olympics
1992 deaths
Sportspeople from Budapest